Scars of Dracula is a 1970 British horror film directed by Roy Ward Baker for Hammer Films. It stars Christopher Lee as Count Dracula, along with Dennis Waterman, Jenny Hanley, Patrick Troughton, and Michael Gwynn.

Although disparaged by some critics, the film does restore a few elements of Bram Stoker's original character: the Count is introduced as an "icily charming host;" he has command over nature; and he is seen scaling the walls of his castle. It also gives Lee more to do and say than any other Hammer Dracula film except his first, 1958's Dracula.

Plot
In the opening scene, Count Dracula's remains are seen lying on a stone plinth in a chamber in his castle. The chamber can be accessed only through the window, set high in his castle wall. It is not explained why his remains are at the castle or how he came to die there. Suddenly, a large bat flies in and hovers over the plinth, regurgitating blood onto the Count's remains. Almost immediately, the remains start to interact and bond with the dripped blood. Within seconds, Dracula is once more resurrected.

Soon afterwards, local villagers are enraged that yet another young woman has been murdered by the Count. With a priest's blessing, they rise up and set fire to Dracula's castle. However, Dracula is safely asleep in his solid stone chamber. When the villagers return home, they find that every single woman in the village has been slaughtered in the church by vampire bats. Elsewhere, libertine Paul Carlson is falsely accused of rape and flees the Kleinenberg authorities by jumping into a nearby coach which, though driverless, heads off at great speed. After breaking through the border guard, he is knocked off the coach, and stumbles into an inn, persuading the waitress Julia to let him in. The innkeeper – the same man from the prologue – interrupts them though and throws Paul out. Walking in the forest, he finds the driverless coach of Dracula, which the returning Klove, Dracula's servant, drives back to the castle. Initially Paul is welcomed by the Count and a beautiful woman named Tania, who later reveals herself to be imprisoned by Dracula as his mistress. Paul later has a liaison with Tania, who concludes their lovemaking by trying to bite his neck. Dracula appears and, casually throwing off Paul's efforts to stop him, savagely stabs Tania through the heart with a silver dagger for betraying him. He then stoops over to drink the blood from the wounds of her dead body. Dracula's servant Klove dismembers her body and dissolves the pieces in a bath of acid. Locked in the room high in the castle, Paul uses tied-together bed curtains to climb down to a lower window, but the line is withdrawn by Klove and he finds himself in the Count's chamber.

Paul's more sober brother Simon, and Simon's fiancée Sarah Framsen, come searching for him. A maid at the tavern directs them to the castle and they investigate. Dracula immediately has designs on the lovely Sarah, but Klove, who has fallen in love with the young woman after seeing her photograph amongst Paul's possessions, helps the young couple escape by refusing to do Dracula's bidding and remove Sarah's crucifix. The servant pays a terrible price for his disobedience as he is sadistically burnt by Dracula with a red-hot cutlass. Simon, having enlisted the help of the village priest, goes back to the castle to look for Paul. However, the priest is attacked and killed by a large vampire bat, and Simon is betrayed by Klove, ending up in the same doorless, inescapable room as his brother. Opening the coffin in the middle of the room, Simon discovers the sleeping Dracula, but the vampire's power reaches through his closed eyelids, causing the young man to collapse before he can take action against the Count.

When Simon recovers, the vampire has vanished. Investigating the room further, he is horrified to find his brother's drained corpse on a spike. Looking out of the window, Simon is amazed to see the Count running up the wall outside like an insect. With a rope let down by Klove, Simon climbs up the sheer outer wall to go after Sarah, knowing that Dracula may use her as his new mistress. Sarah, meanwhile, has made her way back to the castle battlements as a storm approaches. Suddenly, she is confronted by Dracula, who this time uses his bat familiar to remove her crucifix. Just then, Klove arrives on the battlements and attacks the Count with the dagger the vampire used to murder Tania, but the servant is hopelessly outmatched by the vampire's inhuman strength and is thrown over the side of the castle. Simon arrives on the scene, removes a loose metal spike from the castle's battlements, and throws it at Dracula, intending to pierce the vampire's heart. The spike pierces the Count's lower torso, missing his heart. Unharmed, Dracula raises the spike to impale Simon, but it is struck by lightning and Dracula is immediately engulfed in flames. Staggering in agony, the Count collapses and topples over the castle's battlements, falling to the ground far below, where his corpse continues to burn fiercely...

Cast

 Dennis Waterman as Simon Carlson
 Christopher Lee as Count Dracula
 Jenny Hanley as Sarah Framsen
 Christopher Matthews as Paul Carlson
 Patrick Troughton as Klove
 Anouska Hempel as Tania
 Michael Ripper as Landlord
 Michael Gwynn as The Priest
 Wendy Hamilton as Julie
 Delia Lindsay as Alice
 Bob Todd as Burgomaster
 Toke Townley as Elderly Waggoner

Production

Filming
The film was shot on location in Hertfordshire and made at Elstree Studios, Borehamwood, Hertfordshire, England.

Continuity
This film breaks the continuity maintained through the previous entries in Hammer's Dracula film series: whereas at the end of the preceding film, Taste the Blood of Dracula, the Count met his end in a disused church near London, this film opens with a resurrection scene set in Dracula's castle in Transylvania, with no explanation of how his ashes got there. Furthermore, in Scars of Dracula, the Count has a servant named Klove, played by Patrick Troughton; in the third film of the series, Dracula: Prince of Darkness, Dracula has a servant named Klove (played by Philip Latham) who appears to be a different character, though identically named. The disruption of continuity caused by Scars of Dracula reflects the fact the film was originally tooled as a possible reboot of the series in the event Christopher Lee elected not to reprise the role of Dracula.

Release
The film was released theatrically by EMI Films and American Continental Films Inc. in Great Britain and the United States respectively.

The British Film group EMI took over distribution of the film after Warner Bros. refused to finance/distribute it. It was also the first of several Hammer films to get an 'R' rating.

It was released in some markets on a double feature with The Horror of Frankenstein.

Home media
The film was released on DVD by Anchor Bay Entertainment in 2004. This version is currently out of production. It has since been released as part of "The Ultimate Hammer Collection" DVD range. The disc also features a running commentary, with Christopher Lee and director Roy Ward Baker hosted by Marcus Hearn (co-author of The Hammer Story) . Also revealing are Baker's anecdotes of his arguments with BBFC executive of that time – John Trevelyan. The running time has long been erroneously stated as being up to 96 minutes, usually 95 in most books including the book The Hammer Story. It is in fact short of 92 minutes listed on the Thorn EMI PAL VHS release of the 1980s. Anchor Bay's release has it correctly at 91 minutes.

In 2019 the film was re-released in the U.S. on Blu-ray by Scream Factory (a division of Shout Factory) with special features including one that discussed the making of the film.

Reception
Reviews from critics have been negative. Howard Thompson of The New York Times, reviewing the film along with the other half of the double bill, Horror of Frankenstein, stated that audiences should avoid Scars of Dracula "like the plague," calling it "garish, gory junk". Kevin Thomas of the Los Angeles Times wrote that the film "simply revs up one of the most familiar Dracula plots with sex and violence," adding, "Given something to work with, as in 'The Vampire Lovers,' director Roy Ward Baker can turn out an excellent film. But really all he manages to do here is keep things moving." The Monthly Film Bulletin called it "one of the weaker films in the Hammer Dracula cycle," explaining that "most of the film is padded out with very dull and by now routine filler material, besides some rather unnecessary sadism. Even the normally powerful resurrection sequence is dealt with hastily before the credits, so there is far too little of Christopher Lee and far too much of the various young leads."

Author Lyndon W. Joslin, in his book Count Dracula Goes to the Movies reviewing the many film adaptations of Dracula, wrote: "The plummet in quality that had been threatening the Hammer Dracula series for years finally came to pass with Scars of Dracula, a garish live-action cartoon." John Kenneth Muir in Horror Films of the 1970s called the film "a by-the-numbers sequel that amply demonstrates why the studio's audience was shrinking as the 1960s became the 1970s."

See also
 Vampire film

Notes
 In 1986, Turner purchased pre-May 1986 MGM films, including Scars of Dracula for UK release, now owned by Warner Bros. through Turner Entertainment only in UK.

References

External links

 
 
 
 Online Review

1970 films
1970 horror films
Films shot at EMI-Elstree Studios
Dracula films
Hammer Film Productions horror films
Films directed by Roy Ward Baker
Films scored by James Bernard
20th Century Fox films
Dracula (Hammer film series)
Resurrection in film
Films set in castles
1970s English-language films
1970s British films